Micheal is a masculine given name. It is sometimes an anglicized form of the Irish names Micheál, Mícheál and Michéal; or the Scottish Gaelic name Mìcheal. It is also a spelling variant of the common masculine given name Michael, and is sometimes considered erroneous.

People with the name Micheal

Arts and entertainment
 Micheal Flaherty (educator), co-founder and president of Walden Media, a production company which focuses on films that entertain and educate
 Micheal Kott (born 1961), American actor
 Micheal O'Siadhail (born 1947), Irish poet. Among his awards are The Marten Toonder Prize and The Irish American Culture Institute Prize for Literature
 Micheal David Larsen (1981–2010), American musician, rapper and poet; better known as Eyedea
Micheal Farrell (1940–2000), Irish painter
 Micheal Ray Stevenson (born 1989), American rapper; better known as Tyga
 Micheal Ward (born 1995), English actor

Politics
 Micheal Bergstrom, Republican member of the Oklahoma State Senate, representing the 1st district. He was initially elected in November 2016
 Mike Hudema (born 1976; Micheal Hudema), Canadian activist
 Micheál Martin (born 1960), Irish Fianna Fáil politician and current Taoiseach (Prime Minister) of Republic of Ireland
 Micheal R. Williams (born 1955), Tennessee politician who formerly served in the Tennessee State Senate and was elected county mayor of Union County in August 2010

Sport
 Micheal Azira (born 1987), Ugandan footballer who currently plays for Montreal Impact
 Micheal Barrow (born 1970), former American college and professional football player who was a linebacker in the National Football League (NFL) for twelve seasons
 Micheal Clemons (born 1997), American football player
 Micheal Eric (born 1988), Nigerian professional basketball player for Darüşşafaka of the Turkish Basketbol Süper Ligi (BSL) and the EuroLeague. He played college basketball for Temple
 Micheal Ferland (born 1992), Canadian professional ice hockey winger
 Micheal Haley (born 1986), Canadian professional ice hockey forward. He is currently under contract with the Florida Panthers of the National Hockey League (NHL)
 Micheal Henry (born 1991), Nigerian professional footballer
 Micheal Luck (born 1982), former professional rugby league footballer who played for the North Queensland Cowboys and the New Zealand Warriors. Micheal Luck's position of choice was lock or second-row
 Micheal Nakamura (born 1976), Japanese-born Australian former professional baseball pitcher who played for the Minnesota Twins and Toronto Blue Jays of Major League Baseball (MLB) and the Hokkaido Nippon Ham Fighters, Yomiuri Giants and Saitama Seibu Lions of Nippon Professional Baseball (NPB)
 Micheal Ray Richardson (born 1955), American former professional basketball player and head coach
 Micheal Spurlock (born 1983), American football wide receiver
 Micheal Williams (born 1966), American professional basketball player

Other
 Micheal Ade-Ojo (born 1938), Nigerian business magnate and founder of Elizade University
 Micheal Barrett (born 1964), 17th Sergeant Major of the Marine Corps
 Micheal Clark, American physical therapist
 Micheal Oladimeji Faborede (born 1956), Nigerian educational administrator and a professor of Agricultural Engineering
 Micheal Garing (1988–2019), full name Micheal Anak Garing, a Malaysian who was sentenced to death and executed at the age of 30 in Singapore for murder

People with the name Micheál

Arts and entertainment
 Micheál de Búrc (1800 – 1881), Irish poet
 Micheál de Búrca (1912–1985), Irish artist from Castlebar; appointed Director of the National College of Art and Design in 1942
 Micheál Mac Liammóir (1899–1978), British-born Irish actor, dramatist, impresario, writer, poet and painter
 Micheál Ó Conghaile ( 19th century), Irish scribe
 Micheál Ó Conghaile (writer) (born 1962), Irish writer
 Micheál Ó Síoda (1909–1951), Irish scribe and folklorist

Politics
 Micheál Clery, Irish Fianna Fáil politician, solicitor and teacher
 Micheál Cranitch (1912–1999), Irish Fianna Fáil politician
 Micheál MacGréil (1931–2023), Irish Jesuit priest, sociologist, writer and activist 
 Micheál Martin (born 1960), Irish Fianna Fáil politician and Irish Taoiseach (prime minister)
 Micheál Prendergast (1921–1998), Irish farmer and trader, businessman and company director, and Fine Gael politician
 Micheál Ryan (born 1978), Irish hurler who played as a left wing-back for the Tipperary senior team
 Micheál Schlingermann (born 1991), Irish professional footballer and former Gaelic footballer for Mayo

Religion
 Micheál Ledwith, Irish former Catholic priest of the Diocese of Ferns in County Wexford from 1967 to 2005
 Micheál MacGréil (1931–2023), Irish Jesuit priest, sociologist, writer and activist 
 Micheál Ó Mordha (1639–1723), Irish priest, philosopher and educationalist

Sport
 Micheál Donoghue (born 1974), Irish hurling manager (for Galway) and former player
 Micheál O'Sullivan (born 1977), Irish retired Gaelic footballer who played as a midfielder for the Cork senior team

Other
 Micheál Lehane (born 1979), Irish journalist. In May 2017, it was announced that he would succeed David Davin-Power as joint-Political Correspondent for RTÉ News
 Micheál Ó Droigheaín, Irish national school teacher and Brigadier of the South Connemara Brigade, Irish Republican Army, fl. 1916–1922

People with the name Mícheál 
 Mícheál Ó Muircheartaigh (born 1930), Irish Gaelic games commentator for the Irish national radio and television, RTÉ
 Mícheál Ó Móráin (1912–1983), Irish Fianna Fáil politician who served in several Cabinet positions from 1957 until 1970, most notably as Minister for Justice and Minister for the Gaeltacht
 Mícheál Ó Súilleabháin (1950–2018), Irish musician, composer, academic and educationalist
 Mícheál Ó hEithir (1920–1996; Michael O'Hehir); Irish hurling, football and horse racing commentator and journalist

Masculine given names
Gaelic-language given names
Irish masculine given names
Irish-language masculine given names
Scottish masculine given names
Scottish Gaelic masculine given names